East Warwick Reservoir is located in the London Borough of Waltham Forest at Walthamstow. The storage reservoir  is part of the Lee Valley Reservoir Chain and supplies drinking water to London. The reservoir is owned by Thames Water.

History
The reservoir was constructed on marshland in the mid–19th century by the East London Waterworks Company.

Ecology
The reservoir is part of the Walthamstow Reservoirs Site of Special Scientific Interest. It is particularly favoured by the tufted duck.

Recreation
The reservoir is popular with birdwatchers, naturalists and anglers, but access is by permit only.

The water also functions as a trout fishery.

See also
 London water supply infrastructure

References

Sites of Special Scientific Interest in London
Thames Water reservoirs
Reservoirs in London
Drinking water reservoirs in England